Lee Jong-beom (Hanja: 李鍾範; born August 15, 1970) is a former South Korean professional baseball player who played for the Kia Tigers (formerly the Haitai Tigers) in the KBO League and the Chunichi Dragons in Japan from 1993 to 2011. He is nicknamed "Son of the Wind" (바람의 아들) for his speed. (He was also known as "Baseball Genius" and the "Korean Ichiro".) Lee is widely considered one of the best five-tool players in Korean baseball history, and the best all-around KBO player of the 1990s.

Lee was the 1994 KBO League MVP, a 13-time KBO All Star, and a six-time winner of the KBO League Golden Glove Award. He holds the single-season stolen base record in the KBO, with 84, and once hit .393 in a season, second-best all-time. Lee also won the Korean Series Most Valuable Player Award twice (his Tigers won four Korean Series championships). Lee's number 7 was retired by the Kia Tigers in 2012.

He started his career at shortstop, where he played through 1997, and mainly played outfielder in later years.

Career 

Lee graduated from Gwangju Jeil High School, where he excelled in baseball, leading his team to the Cheongryonggi championship as a senior.

He burst onto the KBO scene as a rookie shortstop in 1993, leading the league in runs, stealing 73 bases, being named to the All-Star team, winning a Golden Glove Award, and leading the Tigers to the Korean Series championship. During the Series, Lee hit .313 (9 hits in 29 at-bats) with three steals, and was given the Korean Series Most Valuable Player Award.

His sophomore season was just as impressive, as he hit .393 (second all-time in the KBO), led the league in hits and runs, and stole a league-record 84 bases. That year he won the KBO League Most Valuable Player Award and his second Golden Glove.

Lee played only a half-season's worth of games in 1995 due to commitments for military service, which is mandatory for all male South Korean citizens over 18.

In 1996, Lee led the league in runs, and again won a Golden Glove. The Tigers prevailed in the Korean Series, with Lee again receiving the series MVP award.

Lee had a "30-60 season" in 1997, in which he hit 30 home runs and stole more than 60 bases. He led the league in runs, picked up another Golden Glove, and his Tigers again won the KBO championship.

Lee moved to the NPB in 1998, playing for the Chunichi Dragons from 1998 to 2001. Over four seasons in the NPB, Lee hit a disappointing .261 with a total of 27 home runs, 99 RBI, and 53 stolen bases (he was also hit by a pitch and broke his elbow in 1998). While in the NPB, Lee shifted from shortstop to the outfield.

After a slow start in Japan in 2001, Lee returned to the KBO and the Tigers. He returned to form in 2002–2004, winning two more Golden Glove awards, leading the league in doubles in 2003, and in runs in 2004. Despite this, he voluntarily took a pay cut after the 2004 season.

Playing for the bronze medal-winning Korean team in the 2006 World Baseball Classic, Lee had six doubles and hit .400, and was named as an outfielder to the All WBC Team (alongside Ken Griffey Jr. and Ichiro Suzuki).

In April 2012, prior to opening day, Lee announced his retirement from baseball.

Over his career, he KBO accumulated 510 stolen bases (second all-time), winning four Gold Gloves as a shortstop and two as an outfielder, and never missing a single All Star Game during his professional career in Korea.

Lee served as a coach for the Hanwha Eagles in 2013–2014.

Personal life 
Lee is married to Jeong Jeong-min their son Lee Jung-hoo is a KBO League player, and won the KBO League Rookie of the Year Award in 2017.

See also 
 List of KBO career stolen bases leaders

References

External links 
 Retired player information from Korea Baseball Organization

Hanwha Eagles coaches
2006 World Baseball Classic players
Kia Tigers players
Chunichi Dragons players
Haitai Tigers players
South Korean expatriate baseball players in Japan
Korean Series MVPs
KBO League Most Valuable Player Award winners
KBO League outfielders
KBO League shortstops
Konkuk University alumni
1970 births
Living people
Asian Games medalists in baseball
Sportspeople from Gwangju
South Korean baseball coaches
Baseball players with retired numbers
Baseball players at the 1990 Asian Games
Baseball players at the 2002 Asian Games
Medalists at the 2002 Asian Games
Asian Games gold medalists for South Korea